The Federal Labor Relations Authority (FLRA) is an independent agency of the United States government that governs labor relations between the federal government and its employees.

Created by the Civil Service Reform Act of 1978, it is a quasi-judicial body with three full-time members who are appointed for five-year terms by the President with the advice and consent of the Senate. One member is appointed by the President to serve as chairman, chief executive officer, and chief administrative officer of the FLRA. The chairman is also ex officio chairman of the Foreign Service Labor Relations Board. The three members cannot be from the same political party.

The Authority adjudicates disputes arising under the Civil Service Reform Act, deciding cases concerning the negotiability of collective bargaining agreement proposals, appeals concerning unfair labor practices and representation petitions, and exceptions to grievance arbitration awards. Consistent with its statutory charge to provide leadership in establishing policies and guidance to participants in the Federal labor-management relations program, the Authority also assists Federal agencies and unions in understanding their rights and responsibilities under the Statute through statutory training of parties.

In 1981, it decertified — that is, stripped it from its status as a representative union -— the air traffic controllers' PATCO union, after the 1981 air traffic controllers strike.

The agency is separate from the National Labor Relations Board, which governs private-sector labor relations.

Board members 
The Board is composed of 3 members, nominated by the President of the United States, with the advice and consent of the Senate, for a term of 5 years. The President can designate the Chairman with no separate Senate confirmation required.

The Board is supported by a General Counsel, who is also nominated by the President of the United States, with the advice and consent of the Senate, for a term of five years. There has been no senate-confirmed General Counsel since Julia Akins Clark left the post in January 2017, and no Acting General Counsel between November 2017 and March 24, 2021, when President Joe Biden named Charlotte A. Dye to be Acting General Counsel. In August 2021, President Biden nominated eight-year assistant general counsel Kurt Rumsfeld to the position.

See also
 Title 5 of the Code of Federal Regulations
 Title 22 of the Code of Federal Regulations
 National Labor Relations Board
 Federal Mediation and Conciliation Service (United States)
 United States Merit Systems Protection Board

References

External links
Federal Labor Relations Authority
Federal Labor Relations Authority in the Federal Register
FLRA Mission and Functions

Labor relations boards
Civil service in the United States
Labor Relations Authority
Government agencies established in 1978
1978 establishments in the United States